The Pizza Company is a restaurant chain and international franchise based in Bangkok, Thailand. With focus on pizza and Italian-American cuisine, it is a wholly owned subsidiary of Minor International (merged with The Minor Food Group). Its branches are spread all across Asia.

History
Established in 1980, the company had operated Tricon Global Restaurants’ franchised Pizza Hut brand since its introduction in Thailand, and when their agreement was terminated, The Pizza Company was established as the company's own brand in 2001.

In 2004, The Pizza Company began to expand and franchise internationally and today the restaurant has franchises in Jordan, the United Arab Emirates, Saudi Arabia, Laos, China, Bahrain, Myanmar and Cambodia. There are also multiple locations in Vietnam, especially in Ho Chi Minh City.

The Pizza Company is currently the largest pizza fast food restaurant chain in Thailand.

International operations

See also

 Minor International
 Fast food restaurant
 List of Italian restaurants

Notes

References

External links

Fast-food franchises
Companies based in Bangkok
Italian restaurants
Restaurant chains in Thailand
Pizza chains
Restaurants established in 1980
Minor International
2006 mergers and acquisitions
Thai companies established in 1980
Food and drink companies established in 1980